Anticipation is an emotion involving pleasure in considering some expected or longed-for good event, or irritation at having to wait.

Anticipation may also refer to:

In media and entertainment
Anticipation (video game), a 1988 game for the Nintendo Entertainment System
Anticipation (advertisement), a 1994–1995 advertising campaign for Guinness
The 67th World Science Fiction Convention, also known as Anticipation, a 2009 science fiction convention held in Montreal
Anticipation, a psychic ability that Odd Della Robbia possessed in the first season of Code Lyoko; an ability he also called "future flash"

In music
Anticipation (Carly Simon album), 1971
"Anticipation" (song), the title track of this album
Anticipation (Lewis Black album), 2008
Anticipation (Josh Nelson album), 2004
Anticipation, a 2009 mixtape by Trey Songz
Anticipation, a type of nonchord tone
"Anticipation", a song by Blonde Redhead from their 2004 album Misery Is a Butterfly
"Anticipation", a track from the soundtrack of the 2015 video game Undertale by Toby Fox

In other uses
Anticipation (animation), a principle in animation that a movement needs a preparatory movement as an anticipation for the actual movement
Anticipation (artificial intelligence), the concept of an agent making decisions
Anticipation (genetics), where the severity of a genetic disorder increases with each generation
Under patent law, when one prior art reference or event discloses all the features of a claim, so that it lacks novelty

See also
"Anticipating", a 2002 song by Britney Spears